Elsteraue is a municipality in the Burgenlandkreis district in Saxony-Anhalt, Germany. It is divided into many municipal districts:
Bornitz
Draschwitz
Göbitz (Göbitz, Maßnitz, Torna)
Könderitz (Könderitz, Etzoldshain, Minkwitz, Traupitz)
Langendorf (Langendorf, Döbitzschen, Staschwitz)
Profen (Profen, Beersdorf, Lützkewitz)
Rehmsdorf (Rehmsdorf, Krimmitzschen, Sprossen)
Reuden (Reuden, Predel, Ostrau)
Spora (Spora, Nißma, Oelsen, Prehlitz-Penkwitz)
Tröglitz (Tröglitz, Alt-Tröglitz, Kadischen, Burtschütz, Stocksdorf, Gleina, Techwitz)

References

Burgenlandkreis